DeepFrost are a Norwegian songwriting and record production team consisting of Jan "Janski" Lindvaag, Thomas J. Heyerdahl and Vegard Strand. Lindvaag and Heyerdahl have worked together as producers, songwriters and artists (Di-Mico and ICE) since the mid-1990s, and started working with Strand in 2006.

Di-Mico (with two additional members Linda Gaathje and Mary Elin Mellemseter) signed with the Norwegian branch of Polygram Records (later Universal Music). Di-Mico released a number of singles, and their debut single entered the Norwegian single charts at #10. When Di-Mico split in 1999, Heyerdahl went on to form the pop-group ICE together with Mellemseter. Gaathje subsequently left the music industry, while Lindvaag continued on as a writer and a producer. 

Credits:
Anything But Monday (#2 US) Innocence (#1 Mexico) Miss A (#1 Korea, #1 Hong Kong, #1 Taiwan), Wonder Girls (#1 Korea, #5 Billboard World Album Chart), Chipz (#1 Holland, #5 Germany, #6 Austria, #12 Switzerland), Samantha Mumba (#1 UK), Soraya (Top 10 Spain), Anna Tsuchiya (Top 10 Japan), HotCha (Top 40 Japan), Sistanova (Germany), Jorun Stiansen (#6 Norway), Baracuda (#5 Norway, #3 Germany), Helene Rask (Top 10 Poland), Sandra Lyng Haugen (Top 10 Norway), Nikki Webster (Top 20 Australia), Suzanna Dee (#3 Dance UK), Mirah (Top 10 Denmark, Top 20 Germany), Scandal'Us (Top 10 Australia), ICE (#2 Norway), TikTak (Top 10 Finland), Di-Mico (Top 10 Norway), Soda (Top 10 Norway), Guri Schanke (Norway), Toril Sivertsen (Norway), UEFA Euro 2000, Linnea Handberg (Denmark), Red Divaz (Norway), Roni Duani (Israel), Amanda (Finland), Seduced (Belgium), BamBee (Norway), C.B. Milton (Belgium), Splash (Norway), B.I.C. (Norway), Wanted (Belgium), Satomi (Japan), NRK MP3, Yeffrii (Colombia).

Remixes: Ludacris, Young Jeezy ft. Akon, Lady GaGa, Stevie Wonder, Tone Damli, Maria Haukaas, Venke Knutson, Philco Fiction, Wonder Girls, Loreen

Selected discography

 Miss A (#1 Korea)
 Wonder Girls (#1 Korea)
 Chipz (#1 Holland, #5 Germany, #6 Austria, #12 Switzerland)
 Samantha Mumba (#1 UK)
 Soraya (Top 10 Spain)
 Anna Tsuchiya (Top 10 Japan)
 HotCha (Top 40 Japan)
 Sistanova (Germany)
 Jorun Stiansen (#6 Norway)
 Baracuda (#5 Norway, #3 Germany)
 Helene Rask (Top 10 Poland)
 Sandra Lyng Haugen (Top 10 Norway)
 Nikki Webster (Top 20 Australia)
 Suzanna Dee (#3 Dance UK)
 Mirah (Top 10 Denmark, Top 20 Germany)
 Scandal'Us (Top 10 Australia)
 ICE (#2 Norway)
 TikTak (Top 10 Finland)
 Di-Mico (Top 10 Norway)
 Soda (Top 10 Norway)
 Guri Schanke (Norway)
 Toril Sivertsen (Norway)
 UEFA Euro 2000
 Linnea Handberg (Denmark)
 Red Divaz (Norway)
 Roni Duani (Israel)
 Amanda (Finland)
 Seduced (Belgium)
 BamBee (Norway)
 C.B. Milton (Belgium)
 Splash (Norway)
 B.I.C. (Norway)
 Wanted (Belgium)
 Satomi (Japan)
 NRK MP3.
 Yeffrii (Colombia).

External links
 DeepFrost website at www.deepfrost.no

Songwriting teams
Record production trios
Norwegian record producers